The Art of Secrets is a book by James Klise and published by Algonquin Young Readers on 22 April 2014. It won the Edgar Award for Best Young Adult in 2015. It was also nominated for the Dorothy Canfield Fisher Children's Book Award in 2016.

External links 
 As reviewed in Publishers Weekly

References 

2014 American novels
American young adult novels
Algonquin Books books